The Shaggy Dog is a 1994 American made-for-television fantasy-comedy film and a remake of the 1959 film of the same name produced by Walt Disney Television that premiered on November 12, 1994 as an ABC Family Movie. It is the first in a series of four remakes of Disney live-action films produced for broadcast on ABC during the 1994–95 television season, the other three being The Computer Wore Tennis Shoes, Escape to Witch Mountain, and Freaky Friday.

Plot
Preteen Martin "Moochie" Daniels just wants a dog, but his dad, Ron, is allergic to canines, like Bundles, the Old English Sheepdog of New neighbor Charlie Mulvihill & his niece Francesca, who secretly trained his pet to help him steal jewels. Mooch's big brother Wilbur "Wilby" is smart, shy and a promising inventor, but hopelessly clumsy when it comes to girls, and is jealous of his slick mate Trey who has no problems. Desperate Wilby cast a spell on himself (he accidentally got from dad's museum of curiosities), which magically transform him into Bundles the Shaggy Dog. He would have back and forward transformations at uncontrollable times. This is how he also knows that the diamond on loan in his father's museum is Charlie's next target.

Cast
 Scott Weinger as Wilbur "Wilby" Daniels/The Shaggy Dog
 Ed Begley Jr. as Ronald "Ron" Daniels
 Sharon Lawrence as Monica Daniels
 Jordan Warkol as Martin "Moochie" Daniels
 Jon Polito as Detective Al
 James Cromwell as Charlie "the Robber" Mulvihill
 Jeremy Sisto as Trey Miller
 Sarah Lassez as Francesca
 Natasha Gregson Wagner as Allison
 Bobby Slayton as Coach Evans
 Rick Ducommun as Officer Kelly
 David Pasquesi as Officer Hanson

References

External links

 

1994 television films
1994 films
1994 comedy films
1994 fantasy films
1990s American films
1990s English-language films
1990s fantasy comedy films
ABC network original films
American comedy television films
American fantasy comedy films
Disney film remakes
Disney television films
Fantasy television films
Films about dogs
Films about shapeshifting
Films based on adaptations
Films based on Austrian novels
Films directed by Dennis Dugan
Remakes of American films
Television films based on books
Television remakes of films
The Shaggy Dog films
Walt Disney anthology television series episodes